Pentalia is a village in the Paphos District of Cyprus, located  north of Amargeti. 
Near Pentalia is the Panagia tou Sinti Monastery (Greek: Παναγία του Σίντη), dedicated to the Virgin Mary. The monastery was founded in the 16th century. It received a Europa Nostra award in 1997 for its restoration and conservation. In the old settlement the older character of building is evident, as there are many traditional stone-built houses along its small narrow streets. In the new settlement, modern buildings have been erected, which are mostly used as cottages for people who come from the region but live elsewhere and visit during the summers or the weekends. The division of Pentalia occurred due to the caving-in of land after the 1953 Paphos earthquake, leading to a decision by Republic of Cyprus authorities on the movement of the population in 1954. Since the 1970s, the village has not escaped the waves of urbanisation that hit the island, and today it counts a few permanent residents who live in both districts.

Topography 
Koupanas is a locality  situated 500 m above sea level.

Climate

References

Communities in Paphos District